The GR 20 (or fra li monti) is a GR footpath that crosses the Mediterranean island of Corsica running approximately north–south, described by the outdoor writer Paddy Dillon as "one of the top trails in the world".

The whole trail is about 180 km long with 12,000 m of elevation gain, clearly waymarked throughout, the walk for most of the 10,000–20,000 hikers per year takes around 15 days. The trail is considered to be the most difficult of all the GR routes and consists of two parts: the northern part, between Calenzana and Vizzavona and the southern part, between Vizzavona and Conca.

Vizzavona is considered the middle as there is a train station, and therefore is an accessible point for walkers beginning or ending a walk consisting of half the route. From Vizzavona, the train can be taken to Bastia or Ajaccio as well as many smaller towns and villages such as Corte. The northern part is considered by some the more difficult part, because of the steep and rocky paths, though this could be an effect of many walkers beginning in the north and not being as fit for this section. The southern part of the trail is often considered easier though the lower altitude may give rise to higher temperatures in summer and so provide more difficult walking conditions.

Along the trail there are mountain huts known as "refuges" or gîtes. The standard and price of accommodations and food varies between refuges. Hikers can sleep in a tent near the refuge, but it is not permitted to pitch tents along the trail.

The GR 20 is an advanced trail. Other less difficult trails on the island include the Mare e monti (sea and mountains) and the Mare a mare (from sea to sea) trails.

The idea of GR 20 comes from a former general inspector for youth and sports, Marcel Schlück, and his friend Guy Degos, both hiking enthusiasts.

Route
 Northern part: Calenzana – Ortu di Piobbu or Bonifatu (alternative route) – Carozzu – Asco Stagnu – Tighjettu – Ciottulu di I Mori (or Castel de Vergio) – Manganu – Petra Piana – L'Onda – Vizzavona
 Southern part: Vizzavona – E Capenelle – I Prati – Usciulu – Matalza (added in the late 2011) – Asinao – I Paliri – Conca

Records
Men's

In June 2016, François D'Haene set a time of 31 hours and 6 minutes. In 2021 this was broken by Lambert Santelli with a time of 30 hours 25 minutes.

Women's

The current record by a woman is held by Anne-Lise Rousset who completed the course in 35 hours and 50 minutes in June 2022.

See also
 Orla Perć
 Aiguilles de Bavella

Citations

External links
GR 20 on the official website of the Parc naturel régional de Corse (in French)

Geography of Corsica
Hiking trails in France
Tourist attractions in Corsica